The Venezuela national rugby union sevens team is Venezuela's representative team in rugby sevens.

Tournament record

South American Men's Sevens 
 2006 - 7th
 2007 - 8th
 2008 - 8th
 2009 - 8th
 2010 - 8th
 2011 - 8th
 2012 - 8th
 2013 - 8th
 2014 - Did not contest
 2015 - 6th

Pan American Games 
 2011 - Did not qualify
 2015 - Did not contest

Bolivarian Games 
 2013 - 5th

Central American and Caribbean Games 
 2010 - 6th
 2014 - 4th

Current squad 
Squad to 2015 South American Men's Sevens.

See also
 Rugby union in Venezuela
 Venezuela national rugby union team
 Venezuela women's national rugby union team (sevens)

References

Rugby union in Venezuela
National rugby sevens teams
R